Graciano Fonseca Fuken (born September 4, 1974 in Soracá, Boyacá) is a retired male professional road racing cyclist from Colombia.

Major results

1996
1st in General Classification Vuelta a Guatemala (GUA)
2001
1st in Stage 13 Vuelta a Colombia, Tunja (COL)
2003
1st in Stage 2 Clásica de Fusagasugá, Alto de San Miguel-Sibaté-Canoas-Soacha (COL)
1st in Stage 3 Clásica de Fusagasugá, Fusagasugá (COL)
2nd in General Classification Clásica de Fusagasugá (COL)
2004
2nd in  National Championships, Road, Elite, Colombia (COL)
2005
1st in Stage 3 Clásica de Fusagasugá, Circuito de Fusagasugá (COL)
1st in Stage 1 Vuelta a Boyacà, Sogamoso (COL)
2nd in General Classification Vuelta a Boyacà (COL)
1st in Stage 7 Vuelta a Colombia, Medellin (Alto de Santa Helena) (COL)
1st in Stage 5 Clásico RCN, Tunja (COL)
1st in Stage 3 Doble Copacabana GP Fides, TTT, La Paz (BOL)
alongside Libardo Niño, Víctor Niño, Freddy Montaña, Iván Casas, and Israel Ochoa
2008
4th in General Classification Vuelta a Bolivia (BOL)

References
 

1974 births
Living people
Sportspeople from Boyacá Department
Colombian male cyclists
Vuelta a Colombia stage winners